For Italy in the World was a political party in Italy, active with voters living abroad, which refers to Mirko Tremaglia, member of National Alliance party and Minister for Italians Abroad in the Berlusconi II cabinet. The party affiliated to the "House of Freedoms", the centre-right coalition led by Silvio Berlusconi.

The list ran in the 2006 Italian general election, and won one seat in the Lower House for Giuseppe Angeli, who joined National Alliance's group.

External links
 Political platform
 List of candidates in the 2006 general election

Italian expatriate representation parties
Political parties with year of establishment missing